Ongjin station is a railway station in Ongjin-ŭp, Ongjin County, South Hwanghae Province, North Korea, on the Ongjin Line of the Korean State Railway.

History
Ongjin Station was opened by the Chosen Railway on 19 May 1937, along with the rest of the Ch'wiya–Ongjin section of the Ongjin Line.

References

Railway stations in North Korea